Frank Giorgio (June 5, 1878 – August 15, 1944) was an Italian-American lawyer, politician, and magistrate from New York.

Life 
Giorgio was born on June 5, 1878, in Potenza, Italy. He immigrated to America with his parents when he was 3. He lived in Manhattan and Brooklyn until 1908, when he settled in Queens. He lived in Woodhaven for 17 years, and in 1935 he moved to Hollis.

Giorgio attended St. Alphonsus school and La Salle Academy. He graduated from St. John's College in 1899 and studied law at New York University School of Law. He received a law degree in 1903 and was admitted to the bar shortly afterwards. For 3 years he had a law practice with James A. Foley. He later practiced law by himself in Manhattan and Woodhaven.

In 1922, Giorgio was elected to the New York State Senate as a Democrat, representing the 2nd District. He served in the Senate in 1923 and 1924. In the Senate, he passed legislation that authorized the construction of the Rockaway Boardwalk, and created a Municipal Court district for the Rockaway area. In 1926, he was appointed a city magistrate for a ten-year term by Mayor Jimmy Walker. In 1936, he was reappointed for another ten-year term by Fiorello La Guardia.

In 1906, Giorgio married Esther Marsh Hobley. Their children were Frank Jr., Herbert P., Douglas J., and Mrs. Ruth McDonald. He was a member of the Elks, the Knights of Columbus, and the Queens County Bar Association.

Giorgio died at home on August 15, 1944. He was buried in St. John Cemetery.

References

External links 

 The Political Graveyard
 Frank Giorgio at Find a Grave

1878 births
1944 deaths
American people of Italian descent
Italian emigrants to the United States
People from Woodhaven, Queens
People from Hollis, Queens
Lawyers from Queens, New York
Politicians from Queens, New York
La Salle Academy alumni
St. John's University (New York City) alumni
New York University School of Law alumni
Democratic Party New York (state) state senators
20th-century American politicians
Burials at St. John's Cemetery (Queens)